The 2013 World Junior Figure Skating Championships was an international figure skating competition in the 2012–13 season. Commonly called "World Juniors" and "Junior Worlds", the event determined the World Junior champions in the disciplines of men's singles, ladies' singles, pair skating, and ice dancing.

The event was held in Milan, Italy from 25 February to 3 March 2013.

Qualification
The competition was open to skaters from ISU member nations who were at least 13 but not 19—or 21 for male pair skaters and ice dancers—before July 1, 2012 in their place of birth. National associations selected their entries according to their own criteria but the ISU mandated that their selections achieve a minimum technical elements score (TES) at an international event prior to the Junior Worlds.

The term "Junior" in ISU competition refers to age, not skill level. Skaters may remain age-eligible for Junior Worlds even after competing nationally and internationally at the senior level. At junior events, the ISU requires that all programs conform to junior-specific rules regarding program length, jumping passes, types of elements, etc.

Minimum TES

Number of entries per discipline
Based on the results of the 2012 World Junior Championships, the ISU allowed each country one to three entries per discipline. Countries which qualified more than one entry in a discipline:

If not listed above, one entry was allowed.

Entries
Member nations selected the following entries:

China removed Yan Han from the roster, despite having three spots. No reason was given.

Schedule
Subject to changes:

 Wednesday, February 27
 11:30–17:10 – Short dance
 17:30–17:50 – Opening ceremony
 18:15–21:15 – Pairs' short
 Thursday, February 28
 11:30–17:40 – Men's short
 19:00–21:50 – Pairs' free
 Friday, March 1
 10:45–17:45 – Ladies' short
 18:45–21:55 – Free dance
 Saturday, March 2
 13:00–16:50 – Men's free
 18:30–22:15 – Ladies' free
 Sunday, March 3
 14:30–17:00 – Exhibitions

Overview
2012 silver medalist Joshua Farris, Shotaro Omori, and Jason Brown, all of the United States, took the top three spots after the men's short program. In the free skating, Farris was second to Brown but finished first overall, Brown moved up from third to take the silver medal, and Omori obtained the bronze. The three Americans produced the first ever sweep of the men's podium at the World Junior Championships.

Samantha Cesario of the United States was first in the ladies' short program, followed by Anna Pogorilaya of Russia and another American Courtney Hicks. Russia's Elena Radionova won the free skating and moved up from fifth to take the gold, Yulia Lipnitskaya climbed from fourth to take silver, and Pogorilaya ended with the bronze. They produced Russia's third sweep of the ladies' podium at Junior Worlds (previously in 1996 and 1998). The sound system failed before the last two skaters, resulting in a thirty-minute interruption.

2012 silver medalists Yu Xiaoyu / Jin Yang of China led after the pairs' short program, with Margaret Purdy / Michael Marinaro of Canada and Haven Denney / Brandon Frazier in second and third respectively. The free skating was delayed by 1 hour and 20 minutes due to a technical problem. Denney / Frazier rose from third to take the gold, Purdy / Marinaro remained in second, and Russia's Lina Fedorova / Maxim Miroshkin climbed from seventh to take the bronze.

2012 silver medalists Alexandra Stepanova / Ivan Bukin of Russia placed first in the short dance, followed by Gabriella Papadakis / Guillaume Cizeron of France and Alexandra Aldridge / Daniel Eaton of the United States. Stepanova / Bukin also won the free dance and took gold. Papadakis / Cizeron held on to silver after placing third in the segment. Papadakis sprained her ankle in an off-ice warm up before the morning practice on March 1. She paused the free dance after 2:52 minutes and was allowed a medical break, after which she and Cizeron completed the dance. Aldridge / Eaton were the bronze medalists for the second year in a row.

Results

Men

Ladies

Pairs

Ice dancing

Medals summary

Medalists
Medals for overall placement:

Small medals for placement in the short segment:

Small medals for placement in the free segment:

By country
Table of medals for overall placement:

Table of small medals for placement in the short segment:

Table of small medals for placement in the free segment:

References

External links
 
 Entries at the International Skating Union

World Junior
World Junior Figure Skating Championships
World Junior Figure Skating Championships